Estadio Zapote was a planned stadium in Tamaulipas, Mexico, that was planned to be opened in 2011. It was going to have a capacity of 50,000 spectators. The stadium was going include a mall and will serve as the new home of Tampico Madero, replacing Estadio Tamaulipas as their home stadium.

External links
Information at club website
Oficial, Tampico tendrá nuevo estadio

..

Zapote
Unbuilt stadiums
Unbuilt buildings and structures in Mexico
Sports venues in Tamaulipas